The Bentley Brooklands Coupé is a two-door hardtop coupé version of the Bentley Azure convertible (itself related to the Bentley Arnage). As a hand-assembled car made in very small numbers, employing traditional coach-building techniques and craftsmanship skills in wood and leather, the Brooklands Coupé is the true successor to the discontinued Bentley Continental R and T. Lifetime production is planned for 550 cars, and deliveries started in the first half of 2008.

It was featured on Top Gear in series 11 by Jeremy Clarkson, and due to the car having so much torque, one of the car's tires blew out during a powerslide after prolonged aggressive driving with its traction control off. With an optional Carbon fibre-reinforced Silicon Carbide (C/SiC) ceramic composite braking system with 14-inch SGL Carbon brake discs (only with 20-inch wheels), the new Brooklands offers more stopping power than any other passenger vehicle currently available for purchase. This coupé lacks a "B" pillar.

Specifications:
maximum rated motive power:  at 4,000 rpm
maximum torque:  at 3,250 rpm
: 5.0 seconds
: 5.3 seconds
Top speed: 
: 11.7 seconds

Gallery

References

External links
BentleyMotors.com official international portal
Bentley Brooklands Image Gallery

Brooklands
Sedans
Rear-wheel-drive vehicles
2010s cars
Cars introduced in 2008